Tiglyl-CoA is an intermediate in the metabolism of isoleucine. It is an inhibitor of N-acetylglutamate synthetase.

References

Thioesters of coenzyme A